Kuba (Likuba, Kyba) is a Bantu language of Kasai, Democratic Republic of Congo.

Ethnologue reports that it is mutually intelligible with Kwala, in the C.20 group where it was classified by Guthrie 1948. However, Nurse & Philippson (2003), it belongs with the Bangi–Ntomba group, C.30.

References

Bangi-Ntomba languages